Cyrtodactylus spinosus is a species of gecko that is endemic to Sulawesi.

References 

Cyrtodactylus
Reptiles described in 2008